Rocca San Giovanni is a comune and town in the province of Chieti in the Abruzzo region of Italy.

Main sights
The main attraction of the neighbourhood is the Abbey of San Giovanni in Venere. Other sights in Rocca San Giovanni include:

church of St. Matthew, a medieval structure inspired, in smaller scale, to the Abbey of San Giovanni in Venere. In the 14th-15th centuries a bell tower was added
remains of the Norman walls, built in 1061
14th century historical center

Twin towns

 Chaingy, France

References

Cities and towns in Abruzzo
Coastal towns in Abruzzo